The 2022 season is Malmö FF's 111th in existence, their 87th season in Allsvenskan and their 22st consecutive season in the league. They are competing in Allsvenskan, the 2021–22 Svenska Cupen, the 2022–23 Svenska Cupen, and the UEFA Champions League.

Players

Squad

Players in/out

In

Out

Player statistics

Appearances and goals

Competitions

Allsvenskan

League table

Results summary

Results by round

Matches

Svenska Cupen
Kickoff times are in UTC+1 unless stated otherwise.

2021–22
The tournament continued from the 2021 season.

Group stage

Knockout stage

2022–23

Qualification stage

UEFA Champions League

Kickoff times are in UTC+2 unless stated otherwise.

Qualifying phase and play-off round

First qualifying round

Second qualifying round

UEFA Europa League

Kickoff times are in UTC+2 unless stated otherwise.

Qualifying phase and play-off round

Third qualifying round

Play-off round

Group stage

The draw for the group stage was held on 26 August 2022.

Non-competitive

Pre-season
Kickoff times are in UTC+1 unless stated otherwise.

Mid-season
Kickoff times are in UTC+2 unless stated otherwise.

Footnotes

External links

  

Malmö FF
Malmö FF seasons
Malmo